The 1991 Berlin Marathon was the 18th running of the annual marathon race in Berlin, Germany, which was held on 29 September. Great Britain's Steve Brace won the men's race in 2:10:57 hours, while the women's race was won by Poland's Renata Kokowska in 2:27:36.
       
A total of 14,849 runners finished the race, 13,456 men and 1393 women.

Results

Men

Women

References 

 Results. Association of Road Racing Statisticians. Retrieved 2020-04-02.

External links 
 Official website

1991 in Berlin
Berlin Marathon
Berlin Marathon
Berlin Marathon
Berlin Marathon